Mehrdad Hedayatian (born 2 November 1997) is an Iranian footballer who plays as a winger who currently plays for Iranian club Naft Masjed Soleyman in the Persian Gulf Pro League.

Club career

Foolad
He made his debut for Foolad in 2nd fixtures of 2017–18 Iran Pro League against Naft Tehran.

References

1997 births
Living people
Iranian footballers
Foolad FC players
Association football midfielders
Pars Jonoubi Jam players
Naft Masjed Soleyman F.C. players
People from Ahvaz
Sportspeople from Khuzestan province